The Residential House of Police Officers is a historic building in Pushkin, Saint Petersburg, Russia, that was built between 1889 and 1901 as a residence for policemen serving the royal palace.

Today the police residence is an object of cultural heritage. The building is located on 32/24 Pushkinskaya Street on the north side of Saint Isaac's Square.

History 
The building was originally occupied by the Material Yard, where warehouses and workshops were located and their employees lived. The need for a police residence arose because the Tsar and his court stayed at Tsarskoe Selo only six months per year.  This forced the palace police to rent apartments for their families in more than one locality.

On the instructions of the Governor of the Tsarskoye Selo Palace, the residence construction was carried out by the architect A. R. Bach and paid for by the Ministry of the Imperial Court. The residence was solemnly laid on July 20, 1899.  By the summer of 1901, it was finished.

During the 1920s, the police residence was transferred to the St. Petersburg State Agricultural University, which turned it into a student hostel. In July 1924, the building housed a student literary circle that was frequently visited by Sergei Esenin.

The police residence remained a hostel until 1997, when the University began reconstruction.

Architecture 
The police residence is a four-story building decorated in eclectic style. The building housed 70 apartments, it was supplied with electricity, central heating, lift, and mechanical ventilation. In the basement was a laundry. The building has mosaic floors and terrazzo slabs that were supplied by the firm "Brothers Botta".

References

Literature

Sources 
 
 

Buildings and structures in Pushkin
1901 establishments in the Russian Empire
Eclectic architecture
Houses completed in 1901
Cultural heritage monuments of regional significance in Saint Petersburg